Jarmila Nygrýnová-Strejčková (15 February 1953 – 5 January 1999) was a long jumper from the Czech Republic, representing Czechoslovakia. She won six medals at the European Athletics Indoor Championships as well as a bronze medal at the 1978 European Athletics Championships. She was born in Plzeň.  She was a three-time competitor at the Summer Olympics, entering the long jump in 1972, 1976 and 1980, and was part of the Czechoslovak team at the inaugural 1983 World Championships in Athletics, finishing tenth in the long jump.

International competitions

References

1953 births
1999 deaths
Sportspeople from Plzeň
Czech female long jumpers
Czechoslovak female long jumpers
Olympic athletes of Czechoslovakia
Athletes (track and field) at the 1972 Summer Olympics
Athletes (track and field) at the 1976 Summer Olympics
Athletes (track and field) at the 1980 Summer Olympics
European Athletics Championships medalists
World Athletics Championships athletes for Czechoslovakia
Universiade medalists in athletics (track and field)
Universiade gold medalists for Czechoslovakia
Universiade silver medalists for Czechoslovakia
Medalists at the 1975 Summer Universiade
Medalists at the 1977 Summer Universiade